Migdal HaEmek–Kfar Baruch railway station is an Israel Railways passenger station situated on the  Jezreel Valley railway. It is served by one to two trains per hour in each direction.

With 259,977 passengers recorded in 2019, it was the least-used station in the North District.

Public transport connections 
There are 8 bus routes that terminate at the station, all of which are operated by Superbus except route 111.
 Route 5: From Migdal HaEmek CBS to the station.
 Route 6: From Migdal HaEmek CBS to the station via neighbourhoods.
 Route 9: From Migdal HaEmek Industrial Area to the station via neighbourhoods.
 Route 19: From Migdal HaEmek Industrial Area to the station via neighbourhoods and Kfar Baruch.
 Route 25: Kfar HaHoresh to the station via Migdal HaEmek.
 Route 105: From Ramat David direct to the station
 Route 111: From Nazareth and Yafia to the station.
 Route 305: From Ramat David to the station via Gvat, Yifat and Sarid.

References

Israel Railways website

Railway stations in Northern District (Israel)
2016 establishments in Israel
Railway stations opened in 2016